The Revolutionary: Samuel Adams is a 2022 biography of Founding Father and American Revolution activist, politician, and patriot Samuel Adams, written by Stacy Schiff.

References 

 
 
 
 https://www.startribune.com/review-the-revolutionary-samuel-adams-by-stacy-schiff/600217703/
 https://lithub.com/what-made-samuel-adams-both-the-most-essential-and-the-least-understood-founding-father/
 https://www.cbsnews.com/video/author-stacy-schiff-discusses-new-book-about-founding-father-samuel-adams/

External links 
 
 Author's website
 Excerpt

2022 non-fiction books
English-language books
American biographies
Little, Brown and Company books
Cultural depictions of Samuel Adams